Belinda Carmen Karahalios is a Canadian politician who served as the member of Provincial Parliament for the riding of Cambridge in the Legislative Assembly of Ontario from 2018 to 2022.

Karahalios was originally elected in the 2018 provincial election as a member of the Progressive Conservative Party of Ontario (PC). She was ejected from the party caucus in July 2020 for voting against Bill 195, which would allow the provincial government to extend emergency powers for up to two years without consulting the legislature. She finished her term as a member of the New Blue Party of Ontario, which is led by her husband, Jim Karahalios. Karahalios was unseated by the Progressive Conservative candidate in the 2022 Ontario general election.

Political career 
Karahalios won in the riding of Cambridge in the Ontario general election in 2018. On June 29, 2018, she was appointed as the parliamentary assistant to Lisa MacLeod, the Minister of Children, Community and Social Services. Following a cabinet shuffle on June 20, 2019, she was appointed as the parliamentary assistant to Sylvia Jones, the Solicitor General.

On November 26, 2019, Karahalios tabled Bill 150, the Ensuring Transparency and Integrity in Political Party Elections Act, 2019. This legislation would make it an offence for anyone in Ontario to commit voter fraud in an internal party election. The grounds for introducing the bill was internal party corruption, alleged by Jim Karahalios, Doug Ford, Vikram Singh, and others in the 2018 Progressive Conservative Party of Ontario leadership election and in the same party's November 2018 convention. The bill passed second reading unanimously, despite initial indications that the Ontario PC caucus would vote against it, and it is now awaiting its third reading.

Karahalios was ejected from the Progressive Conservative caucus by party leader and premier Doug Ford after voting against Bill 195, the Reopening Ontario Act, which would expand the government's emergency authority during the COVID-19 pandemic. Karahalios voted against the legislation, calling it an "unnecessary overreach on our parliamentary democracy."

Karahalios co-founded the New Blue Party of Ontario alongside her husband, Jim Karahalios.

In December 2021, Karahalios was ejected from the Legislative Assembly for failing to present a proof of vaccination. Karahalios presented a negative COVID-19 antigen test, but it was rejected because it had occurred within 90 days of her last positive test.

Karahalios was originally a supporter of Bill 184, which amended the Residential Tenancies Act to remove rent control from any rental units first occupied after November 15, 2018. In a 2020 Committee on Social Policy hearing, during which community organizers and certain MPPs who opposed the bill spoke about the bill's negative impact on the social stability of communities in Toronto (including such issues as bad faith evictions leading to homelessness), Karahalios expressed concern about the "vilification" of landlords, and noted that "We hear stories from both tenants and landlords, and yes, I’ve come across bad tenants and bad landlords. Not all landlords are bad and not all tenants are bad." After other members of the Committee and the community who were present at the meeting described the impact of rent decontrol leading to profit-motivated evictions by the large corporations which provide the majority of rental housing in Ontario, Karahalios reiterated her concern about "small [landlords] who ... wound up with some tenants they’re not having a great experience with."

Karahalios was unseated by the Progressive Conservative candidate in the 2022 Ontario general election. She ran for Cambridge City Council in the 2022 municipal elections, but lost.

Personal life 
Belinda Karahalios is married to Jim Karahalios, a corporate lawyer and founder of activist groups "Axe The Carbon Tax" and "Take Back Our PC Party", who was disqualified from running in the 2020 Conservative Party of Canada leadership election. She is of mixed Trinidadian and Portuguese descent.

Election results

References 

1982 births
Progressive Conservative Party of Ontario MPPs
Women MPPs in Ontario
Living people
People from Cambridge, Ontario
Politicians from Mississauga
Canadian people of Trinidad and Tobago descent
Canadian people of Portuguese descent
Black Canadian politicians
21st-century Canadian women politicians
Independent MPPs in Ontario
Politicians affected by a party expulsion process
New Blue Party of Ontario MPPs